The Multinational Joint Task Force (MNJTF) is a combined multinational formation, comprising units, mostly military, from Benin, Cameroon, Chad, Niger, and Nigeria. It is headquartered in N'Djamena and is mandated to bring an end to the Boko Haram insurgency.

History
The task force was first organised as a solely Nigerian force in 1994, during the administration of Sani Abacha, to "checkmate banditry activities and to facilitate free movement" along its northern border. In 1998 it was expanded to include units from neighbouring Chad and Niger with the purpose of dealing with common cross-border security issues in the Lake Chad region, with its headquarters in the town of Baga, Borno State.

Islamist groups grew and expanded their operations during the 2000s and early 2010s. Boko Haram's insurgency began in 2009, and security forces across the region were increasingly directly challenged by jihadist militant groups. Boko Haram and Ansaru were the most active and well known. In April 2012, the MNJTF's mandate was expanded to encompass counter-terrorism operations.

Brig. Gen. Enitan Ransome-Kuti, son of Beko Ransome-Kuti and nephew of the musician Fela Kuti was a previous commander of the force.

Development
In January 2015 the MNJTF headquarters in Baga, Nigeria, was overrun by militants of Boko Haram, who then proceeded to massacre local residents and destroy the town, displacing many citizens. At the time, only Nigerian soldiers were present in the HQ. There were reports that they fled the attackers. It was an ignominious moment for the MNJTF, and indeed the contributing nations. The political process of expanding the MNJTF was given new strength and energy which led to swifter progress, including the expansion of troop numbers and mandate, and relocation of the HQ to N'Djamena, Chad.

The most significant structural changes for the MNJTF that emerged from the meetings in 2015 were a rise in numbers, the creation of a new Concept of Operations under the supervision of the Lake Chad Basin Commission, and the move of the HQ to N'Djamena. It was agreed that a Nigerian officer would be the Force Commander for the duration of the mission against Boko Haram, with a Cameroonian as Deputy Commander and Chadian Chief of Staff. Major-General Tukur Yusuf Buratai (Nigerian) was appointed first Commander of the rejuvenated MNJTF in May 2015. However, his command was short lived as in July 2015 he was appointed Nigeria's Chief of Army Staff and handed command to Major-General Iliya Abbah (Nigerian) on 31 July 2015. Nigerian Major-General Lamidi Adeosun, was appointed MNJTF Commander in January 2016. Adeosun was in turn replaced as commander by Major-General Lucky Irabor in May 2017. In August 2018, Irabor is replaced by Major-General C.O. Ude. Maj Gen I.M.Yusuf took over from Ude, while Current commander Maj Gen J.J Ogunlade took over from yusuf on 19 Mar.

The Force is structured in four national sectors: Sector 1 (Cameroon) headquartered at Mora; Sector 2 (Chad) headquartered at Baga-Sola; Sector 3 (Nigeria) based in Baga; and Sector 4 (Niger), based in the town of Diffa.

There is still considerable skepticism in the international community that the new force can deliver results, and its success or otherwise as a multinational endeavour will be closely monitored. Discontent has been voiced within coalition by Chadian president Idris Deby for shouldering disproportionate burden of fighting armed groups and announced confining its military operations to its boundaries.

See also
Boko Haram insurgency
G5 Sahel
African Union Mission to Somalia
United Nations-African Union Mission in Darfur
Force Intervention Brigade
American military intervention in Cameroon

References

Boko Haram insurgency
Counterterrorism in Nigeria
Military units and formations established in 1994
Military units and formations of Nigeria
Multinational army units and formations